The Chandalar River (T'eedriinjik  in Gwich'in) is a  tributary of the Yukon River in the U.S. state of Alaska.

The Chandalar River main stem begins at the confluence of the North Fork Chandalar River and the Middle Fork Chandalar River and flows generally southeast through the state's northern interior southeast of the Philip Smith Mountains of the Brooks Range.

Major tributaries
At the North Fork headwaters is a flat valley known as Chandalar shelf just east of the Dalton Highway, where caribou are known to winter.

The  Middle Fork Chandalar River heads up in the Philip Smith Mountains east of Atigun Pass. It flows generally south from the mountains to join the North Fork.

From there, it flows generally southwest past Arctic Village to enter the main stem upstream of Venetie.

West Fork Chandalar River, a  tributary of the North Fork Chandalar River, flows east from mountainous terrain east of Coldfoot.

Recreation
Although the lower river can be fished for northern pike, sheefish and salmon, the upper river, its tributaries, headwaters, and nearby lakes offer "the most exciting fishing possibilities". The main sportfishing species in the basin are northern pike, Arctic grayling, charr, and lake trout.

Anglers and hunters typically enter the region by airplane or, in winter, by snowmobile. It is possible for experienced boaters to float and fish the river system in rafts or kayaks. Hazards include shallows and rapids. There are no public campgrounds or other facilities; however, there is a fishing lodge at Chandalar Lake.

Gallery

See also
List of rivers of Alaska

References

Works cited

External links
Chandalar River Valley Mountain, north of Arctic Village

Rivers of Alaska
Rivers of Yukon–Koyukuk Census Area, Alaska
Brooks Range
Tributaries of the Yukon River
Rivers of Unorganized Borough, Alaska